The second season of The Switch Drag Race began airing on 25 March 2018 on the MEGA and WOW Presents Plus's streaming service. It ran for thirty-one episodes.

The winner of second series of The Switch Drag Race was Miss Leona, with Gia Gunn, Pavel Arámbula and Sofía Camará as the runner-up.

Challenges
Each episode, with the guidance of the six celebrity coaches, the contestants compete in the following challenges;

Leaders Challenge: In this first test, each contestant from the Chilean group gets paired together with a contestant from the opposing group of "foreigners" to form duos. Together, they must impersonate a celebrity à la Season 1's Artistic Challenge. The duo that succeeds earned immunity and the power of leadership over both respective groups.
Artistic Challenge: In this second test, the remaining contestants compete within their respective teams (one team consisting of the Chileans and the other consisting of the "foreigners") in a performance-based Artistic Challenge, similar to that of Season 1. Both groups compete in one Imitation Challenge each. The lowest performing contestant gets nominated by the judges to be a duelist in the Extreme Imitation Duel.
Extreme Imitation Duel: The two lowest scoring performers in each of the teams' Artistic Challenges go up against each other in an extreme, rapid-paced Imitation challenge, in which they must transform into famous pop singers and perform a number within a given time frame, with the assistance of their respective team leaders. The loser of this duel effectively sends their entire team to the Elimination Gala.
Nomination Mirror: The safe team will each nominate someone from the losing team to go straight to the Elimination Duel. The contestant with the most votes will not be able to participate in the Elimination Gala.
Elimination Gala (Singing Challenge): The team whose member lost the previous duel must compete against each other in a singing gala à la Season 1, where their performances are scored from 1 to 7 by each judge, with the lowest scoring performer being sent to the Elimination Duel.
Elimination Duel: The lowest scored performer in the Elimination Gala is put up against the contestant nominated during the Nomination Mirror round. They both perform a live song of their choosing and the judges vote by majority who shall be eliminated.

Contestants

Ages, names, and cities stated are at time of filming.

Contestant progress

Episodes

References

The Switch Drag Race
2018 in Chilean television
2018 in LGBT history
Switch
2018 television seasons